James Nazroo, PhD, MBBS FBA FaCSS, is Professor of Sociology at the University of Manchester. He is the founding and Deputy Director of the ESRC Centre of Dynamics of Ethnicity (CoDE), co-Principal Investigator (PI) of the Synergi Collaborative Centre, which is investigating ethnic inequalities in severe mental illness, and founding and co-Director of the Manchester Institute for Collaborative Research on Ageing (MICRA). Issues of inequality, social justice and underlying processes of stratification have been the primary focus of his research activities, centring on ethnicity/race, ageing, gender, and the interrelationships between these. Central to his work on ethnicity/race has been developing an understanding of the links between ethnicity, racism, class and inequality. This work has covered a variety of elements of social disadvantage, how these relate to racialised identities and processes of racism, and how these patterns have changed over time. He has also explored the role of access to and quality of health services, including a critical examination of mental health services. His research on ageing has been concerned to understand the patterns and determinants of social and health inequalities in ageing populations. He has conducted studies on quality of life for older people among different ethnic groups in the UK, on inequalities in health at older ages, and on routes into retirement and the impact of retirement on health and well-being. He was PI of the fRaill programme, an interdisciplinary study of inequalities in later life, and is co-PI of the English Longitudinal Study of Aging (ELSA) which is a multi-disciplinary panel study of those aged 50 and older.

Honours
In March 2015, Nazroo was elected a Fellow of the Academy of Social Sciences  (FAcSS).

In 2020 Nazroo was elected a Fellow of the British Academy.

References

External links
Faculty page

British sociologists
Medical sociologists
Academics of the University of Manchester
Living people
Alumni of St George's, University of London
Alumni of Royal Holloway, University of London
Alumni of University College London
Academics of Royal Holloway, University of London
Fellows of the Academy of Social Sciences
Year of birth missing (living people)